Her Majesty's Ambassador to Oman is the United Kingdom's foremost diplomatic representative in Oman, and is the head of Britain's diplomatic mission in Muscat. 

Until 1971 the British representative in Muscat was a Consul-General. Following the accession of Sultan Qaboos in 1970, the Sultan agreed that the Consulate-General should be raised to an embassy, and the first British Ambassador (and the first Ambassador of any country) to the Sultanate, Donald Hawley, presented his credentials to the Sultan on 22 July 1971.

British Ambassadors to Oman
1971–1974: Donald Hawley
1975–1979: James Treadwell
1979–1981: Ivor Lucas
1981–1986: Duncan Slater
1986–1990: Robert Alston
1990–1994: Sir Terence Clark
1994–1999: Sir Richard Muir
1999–2002: Sir Ivan Callan
2002–2005: Stuart Laing
2005–2011: Dr Noel Guckian
2011–2014: Jamie Bowden
2014–2017: Jonathan Wilks

2017–2021: Hamish Cowell
2021-2022: William Murray
2023-present: James Goldman

References

External links
UK and Oman, gov.uk

Oman
 
United Kingdom